George Mason Patriots basketball may refer to either of the basketball teams that represent George Mason University:

George Mason Patriots men's basketball
George Mason Patriots women's basketball